Memorabilia are objects treasured for their memories or historical interest.

Memorabilia may also refer to:

 Memorabilia (event), a British fan convention for collectors of memorabilia
 Memorabilia (Xenophon), a collection of Socratic dialogues by Xenophon
 Memorabilia – The Singles, a 1991 compilation album by Soft Cell and Marc Almond
 "Memorabilia", a 1980 song by Soft Cell
 "Memorabilia" (The Flash), an episode of the American TV series

See also

 Hypomnemata
 Factorum ac dictorum memorabilium libri IX by Valerius Maximus